Emil Herman Steiger (September 27, 1871 – November 21, 1929) was an American businessman and politician.

Biography
Emil H. Steiger was born in Fremont, Wisconsin on September 27, 1871. He went to the Oshkosh Business College in Oshkosh, Wisconsin. He worked for the Grass Twine Company and in logging. Steiger served on the Fremont Village Board and was involved with the Republican Party. He served in the Wisconsin State Assembly from 1899 to 1903. Steiger was president of the Dextox Grass Rug Company and Pure Ice Company in Oshkosh, Wisconsin.

He married Sophia Faust on June 19, 1895, and they had four children.

Steiger died suddenly of a heart attack in Oshkosh while eating dinner.

References

1871 births
1929 deaths
Politicians from Oshkosh, Wisconsin
People from Waupaca County, Wisconsin
Businesspeople from Wisconsin
Wisconsin city council members
Republican Party members of the Wisconsin State Assembly